Lieutenant-Commander Colin John de Mowbray, MBE (12 April 1945 – 11 July 2010) was a helicopter pilot and veteran of the Falklands war; in retirement he sailed in, and organised, round-the-world yacht races.

Early life and education 
De Mowbray was son of a Royal Navy captain. He attended Stowe School and from September 1963 the Britannia Royal Naval College in Dartmouth, Devon before going to the Royal Naval Air Station in Arbroath.

Military career 

In the 1960s he served as a "jungly" in Borneo, flying the Royal Marines of 45 Commando to and from jungle locations that he was advised to "memorise then forget".

In 1976 he attended the staff course at Greenwich.

In the late 1970s served on the British naval staff in Washington, DC.

In 1982 during the Falklands War he was Executive Officer and First-Lieutenant (second in command) of HMS Alacrity.

From 1984 until 85 he commanded 845 Naval Air Squadron

He was appointed MBE in 1992 and retired from the Navy in 1994.

Retirement 
In 1996 De Mowbray was the skipper of Crysolite in the first Clipper Round the World Yacht Race. He went on to become race director from 1998 until 2003, and then operations director, responsible for liaison with sponsor cities and host ports. He continued to work for Clipper Ventures until shortly before his death.

Clipper Race Yacht Club 
de Mowbray was the founder and first Commodore of the Clipper Race Yacht Club. He described it as "a logical way to bring some gentle order to this special group of adventurers". On 24 April 2009 the club was officially launched at a ceremony at St Katharine's Dock. The purpose of the club is to create an association of Clipper alumni to the mutual advantage of all parties and for the purpose of having fun. Membership is open to individuals who have completed at least one leg of the Clipper Round the World yacht race, or competed with Clipper in another approved race, or have been associated with Clipper Ventures as a staff member.

References

External links
Obituary in The Herald Scotland
de Mowbray - Colin, Vanessa, Clare, Sarah, Ric de Mowbray family web site
Clipper Race Yacht Club
Colin's blog
 Obituary in The Times
Obituary in The Kirkintilloch Herald
Sail World article on the Red Socks Regatta
Clipper alumni paints the Solent red in memory of Colin de Mowbray MBE
Clipper Race Yacht Club Facebook page

1945 births
2010 deaths
Fleet Air Arm aviators
Royal Navy officers
Royal Navy personnel of the Falklands War
English sailors
Helicopter pilots
Members of the Order of the British Empire
People educated at Stowe School